Sachi Baat SK Niazi k Sath is a flagship Roze News program which is a one-hour debate on current events hosted by Sardar Khan Niazi. Capital Talk looks at the challenges, issues and concerns facing Pakistan on a daily basis. The format includes a panel of renowned personalities who participate in a dialogue which contributes towards reaching feasible and practical solutions. Going along with the principle that there are two sides of every picture, “Sachi Baat” helps you discover both these sides. The aim of the show is to stay on top of the news and provide prompt and detailed analysis, leaving the audiences with a clearer picture. Sachi Bat expands on debates, which in turn, helps provide insights into the raging issues of Pakistan's political set-up, no matter how contentious.

It is broadcast three days a week (Monday to Wednesday) on Roze News. It is very famous   current events program in Pakistan. Special transmissions are also broadcast focusing on crises zones, more important ones of which took place during Long March.

See also
 The Daily Pakistan

References

Pakistani television talk shows